Vicky Theodoropoulou (born 1958 in Athens, Greece) is a Greek writer.  She read Modern History in Athens and in Paris at the Sorbonne University and she was a journalist for major Greek newspapers and a broadcaster on the Greek Radio Organisation. At the same time, she wrote books spanning from historical documentation to literature to a genre of
psychogeographical impressions. Her first novel, Letter from Dublin (Hestia Publishers, 1997), was awarded the Maria Ralli Prize for a first-published author.

External links
 Official site of Vicky Theodoropoulou

1958 births
Living people
University of Paris alumni
Greek women writers
Writers from Athens
Mass media people from Athens